Imre Kónya (born 3 May 1947 in Budapest) is a Hungarian politician and lawyer, who served as Interior Minister between 1993 and 1994, in the cabinet of Péter Boross.

Between 1966 and 1971 he attended the Faculty of Law of the Eötvös Loránd University.

References
Kónya Imre 1996-os országgyűlési életrajza

1947 births
Living people
Politicians from Budapest
Hungarian Democratic Forum politicians
Hungarian Interior Ministers
Members of the National Assembly of Hungary (1990–1994)
Members of the National Assembly of Hungary (1994–1998)